Sherrell Point is a point at the south end of Astrolabe Island, off Trinity Peninsula in Antarctica. It is situated 1.15 km southeast of Gega Point, 4.5 km southeast of Raduil Point and 2.28 km southwest of Rogach Peak.  Following air photography and ground survey by FIDASE, 1956–57, the feature was named for Frederick W. Sherrell, surveyor and geologist in this area with FIDASE, 1955–56.

Maps
 Trinity Peninsula. Scale 1:250000 topographic map No. 5697. Institut für Angewandte Geodäsie and British Antarctic Survey, 1996.
 Antarctic Digital Database (ADD). Scale 1:250000 topographic map of Antarctica. Scientific Committee on Antarctic Research (SCAR). Since 1993, regularly upgraded and updated.

References
 Sherrell Point. SCAR Composite Antarctic Gazetteer.

Headlands of Trinity Peninsula
Astrolabe Island